Alfredsson is a surname. Notable people with the surname include:

Axel Alfredsson (1902–1966), Swedish football (soccer) player who competed in the 1924 Summer Olympics
Daniel Alfredsson (born 1972), Swedish professional ice hockey player
Helen Alfredsson (born 1965), Swedish professional golfer

See also
 Alfredson

Swedish-language surnames